USS Vision has been the name of more than one United States Navy ship, and may refer to:

, later USS SP-744, a patrol boat in commission from 1917 to 1919
, a patrol boat in commission from 1917 to 1918

Vision